The list of ship launches in 1911 includes a chronological list of some ships launched in 1911.


References

Sources

1911
1911 in transport